Cornelia B. Wilbur (August 26, 1908 – September 20, 1992) was an American psychiatrist. She is best known for a book, written by Flora Rheta Schreiber, and a television film, both titled Sybil, which were presented as non-fiction accounts of the psychiatric treatment she rendered to a person diagnosed with dissociative identity disorder.

Early life and education
Cornelia Burwell Wilbur was born in Cleveland, Ohio, on August 26, 1908. While she was an infant, her family moved to a ranch in Montana. The family returned to Cleveland in 1918. She was educated in the public schools in Montana and Cleveland.

She attended William Smith College in Geneva, New York, before enrolling at the University of Michigan in Ann Arbor, Michigan. She received her bachelor's degree and master's degree from the University of Michigan. She then enrolled at the University of Michigan Medical School. While in medical school, she became the first female extern at Kalamazoo State Hospital, where she also successfully treated an agoraphobic girl diagnosed with hysteria. Wilbur graduated with an M.D. in 1939. She was one of eight woman in her graduating class.

Wilbur practiced psychiatry in Omaha, Nebraska; New York City; and Weston, West Virginia.

Wilbur is best known for her work with Shirley Ardell Mason, who was purported to have been severely abused as a child, and who developed 16 alternate personalities as a result. A book, written by Flora Rheta Schreiber, and a television film, both titled Sybil, were ostensibly non-fiction accounts of the psychiatric treatment received by Mason while in Wilbur's care. She diagnosed and treated Mason for dissociative identity disorder (then referred to as Multiple Personality Disorder) for 11 years, beginning in 1954.

Academic career
Wilbur joined the University of Kentucky College of Medicine in 1967, earning an appointment as a professor of psychiatry.

Wilbur was a pioneer clinician, as well as an educator, researcher, and mentor for others in the field of psychiatry. Wilbur was one of the authors of Homosexuality: A Psychoanalytic Study of Male Homosexuals (1962), an influential study of the development of male homosexuality.

Wilbur lectured around the world about child, spouse, and elder abuse and their repercussions, and advocated parenting education to prevent child abuse. She was also interested in increasing the admission rates of women to medical schools.

In the late 1970s, Wilbur consulted on the case of Billy Milligan, the first man to be acquitted of a crime in the United States by reason of insanity due to multiple personality disorder.

Wilbur was a Diplomate of the American Board of Neurology and Psychiatry in both Neurology and Psychiatry (1946), had a certificate in psychoanalysis (1951), and was Professor Emerita at the University of Kentucky Medical College. She was a Life Fellow of the American Medical Association, the American Psychiatric Association, and the American Academy of Psychoanalysis.  She was honored by the University of Kentucky Medical College for her Outstanding Contribution to Medical Education. In 1987, she was honored for her Distinguished Achievements by the International Society for the Study of Multiple Personality and Dissociative Disorders. She published about 50 papers in peer-reviewed professional journals.

Mason controversy
Wilbur's diagnosis of Mason has been questioned, and both Flora Schreiber and she have been accused of inventing or exaggerating the multiple personality diagnosis and manipulating Mason for professional and financial gain. One examination of the case of "Sybil" is Debbie Nathan's book Sybil Exposed: The Extraordinary Story Behind the Famous Multiple Personality Case. Nathan presented evidence that Mason never displayed multiple personalities until she met Wilbur. The patient's symptoms emerged over the years from a mutually reinforced self-deception of both Mason and Wilbur. Nathan's research indicated that Wilbur and Schreiber fabricated aspects of the treatment narrative in Sybil to bolster their claims about Mason, even including Mason's father's false claim that Mason's mother had been diagnosed with schizophrenia.

External links
Ace Weekly Magazine Article – August 2, 2001
Images in Psychiatry:  Cornelia B. Wilbur

References

1908 births
1992 deaths
American psychiatrists
University of Michigan Medical School alumni
20th-century American physicians
American women psychiatrists
20th-century American women physicians